Or Was It? is the eleventh studio album by King Creosote, released in 2000.

Track listing

Coming On Up
Closet Case
The Nobody Now
Play for the Kenny
Lighthouse
Chinese Landlord
Religious Boy
Heap of Trash
Wooden
The Bear
Bus Shelter Dirns
Untitled

References

2000 albums
King Creosote albums